The Americas records in swimming are the fastest times ever by a swimmer representing a country from the Americas, which are recognised and ratified by the Amateur Swimming Union of the Americas (UANA).
These records should not be confused with the USA national records, typically referred to as the "American records", despite their similarities.

All records were set in finals unless noted otherwise.

Long course (50 m)

Men

Women

Mixed relay

Short course (25 m)

Men

Women

Mixed relay

References

Americas
Records
Swimming